KWWE-LD (channel 19) is a low-power television station in Lake Charles, Louisiana, United States, affiliated with MyNetworkTV, MeTV, and Telemundo. It is owned by SagamoreHill Broadcasting alongside CBS affiliate KSWL-LD (channel 17). Both stations share studios on West Prien Lake Road in Lake Charles, while KWWE-LD's transmitter is located at the KTSR tower in Westlake.

History 
Although granted a construction permit by the Federal Communications Commission (FCC) on February 22, 2011, the station did not make it to air for another six years or so. The permit was granted under the assigned callsign of K19JB-D. It was originally owned by DTV America of Sunrise, Florida.

DTV America, which have launched several low-powered television stations in several other markets providing multicast network programming throughout the mid 2010s, initially planned to launch a MyNetworkTV/DrTV hybrid station on UHF channel 19 as they held a construction permit under a callsign of K19JB-D, but it never went on the air.

Those plans were canceled indefinitely in February 2017 when the permit for K19JB-D was sold to Lake Charles Television, LLC, a unit of Waypoint Media, which signed on CBS affiliate KSWL-LD in the same month.

The callsign was changed to the current KWWE-LD on February 7, 2017. The following month, KWWE-LD signed on as the area's first MyNetworkTV affiliate, but instead of DrTV, some syndicated programming surrounded the network's primetime schedule. Prior to this, KADN-DT3 in Lafayette (and its sister station and now-NBC affiliate KLAF-LD prior to that) served as the market's default MyNetworkTV affiliate. KWWE-LD's sign-on also left ABC as the only major network not available on a local outlet in the Lake Charles area (Lafayette's KATC-TV and/or Beaumont, Texas-based KBMT served as Lake Charles' default ABC affiliates until August 31, 2017 when Fox affiliate KVHP launched an ABC affiliate on its DT2 subchannel).

In addition to MyNetworkTV programming, KWWE-LD also serves as the Lake Charles market's MeTV affiliate, filling in programming for all time slots outside of the MyNetworkTV programming schedule with the MeTV schedule. Initially shown by itself on its LD2 subchannel, MeTV programming has since moved to KWWE-LD's main channel and was replaced on LD2 with a simulcast of KSWL-LD. In 2019, the station added Telemundo to its third subchannel.

Technical information

Subchannels
The station's digital signal is multiplexed:

References

External links

 
 

Low-power television stations in the United States
MyNetworkTV affiliates
MeTV affiliates
Telemundo network affiliates
Laff (TV network) affiliates
Scripps News affiliates
WWE-LD
Television channels and stations established in 2017
2017 establishments in Louisiana